Who Else! is the seventh studio album by guitarist Jeff Beck, released on 16 March 1999 through Epic Records. The album reached No. 99 on the U.S. Billboard 200 and marks the end of a decade-long absence of original material from Beck since the release of Jeff Beck's Guitar Shop in 1989. Stylistically it showcases the first addition of electronic and techno music into his repertoire, along with the blues-based instrumental rock and jazz fusion of previous albums.

Fellow guitarist Jennifer Batten, having often cited Beck's influence on her playing, is featured as a collaborator and subsequently joined him on tour for three years. The album features the collaborative songwriting of Tony Hymas. "Brush with the Blues" became a signature tune and concert staple, and along with "Angel (Footsteps)" made it onto his 2008 concert album Live at Ronnie Scott's. "What Mama Said" samples Dick Shawn's dialogue from the 1963 film It's a Mad, Mad, Mad, Mad World

Track listing

Personnel
Jeff Beck – guitar, arrangement, producer
Jennifer Batten – guitar, guitar synthesizer
Mark Johns – guitar (track 10)
Tony Hymas – keyboard (except track 9), sound effects, arrangement, production
Jan Hammer – keyboard (track 9), drums (track 9)
Simon Wallace – synthesizer (track 10)
Steve Alexander – drums (except tracks 2, 9, 10)
Manu Katché – drums (track 2), percussion (track 2)
Randy Hope-Taylor – bass (except track 2)
Pino Palladino – bass (track 2)
Bob Loveday – violin (track 10)
Clive Bell – flute (track 10)

Technical
Simon Brint – editing (track 1), production assistance (track 10)
Chris Sheldon – mixing
Bob Ludwig – mastering
Danny Clinch – cover photography

Chart performance

References

External links
In Review: Jeff Beck "Who Else!" at Guitar Nine Records

Jeff Beck albums
1999 albums
Epic Records albums